Meredith Perry is an American inventor, entrepreneur, and scientist, most well known for the invention of uBeam, a wireless charging system based on ultrasound.

Biography

Career 
Perry studied paleobiology and astrobiology at the University of Pennsylvania and conducted astrobiology research with the NASA Ames Research Center and the NASA Astrobiology Institute. She is a NASA Astrobiology Institute Research Scholarship Recipient and NASA Pennsylvania Space Grant Recipient. She co-authored two astrobiology research papers with Christopher McKay of NASA Ames Research Center.

Perry won the University of Pennsylvania's Invention Competition, "PennVention" in 2011 for her ultrasonic wireless power transmission system, which she named "uBeam". Perry founded uBeam in 2011 and raised $40M from Founders Fund, Andreessen Horowitz, Mark Cuban, Marissa Mayer and other prominent investors. She stepped down as CEO in 2018 after "repeatedly missing self-imposed deadlines for progress" and the company moved from trying to build its own products to licensing its technology for other companies to use.

Perry announced through a tweet in 2019 that she is developing a new neurotechnology, and subsequently announced in 2020 a new company co-founded for this purpose, Elemind Technologies.

Awards and recognition 
Perry was recognized as one of Fast Company's "Most Creative People", has been included in Fortune’s “40 Under 40” Mobilizers, Forbes’ “30 Under 30” and Vanity Fair’s “The New Establishment”. Perry is the recipient of ELLE Magazine’s Genius Award.

References 

Year of birth missing (living people)
Living people
21st-century American inventors
American scientists
American businesspeople
Astrobiologists